Laurier—Sainte-Marie  is a federal electoral district in Downtown Montreal, Quebec, Canada, that has been represented in the House of Commons of Canada since 1988. Its population in 2016 was 111,835.

Geography
The district includes Côte Saint-Louis and the eastern parts of The Plateau and Mile End in the Borough of Le Plateau-Mont-Royal and the eastern part of Downtown Montreal and the western part of Centre-Sud (including part of the neighbourhood of Sainte-Marie) in the Borough of Ville-Marie.

History
In 1987, the district of "Laurier—Sainte-Marie" was created from Laurier, Montreal—Sainte-Marie and Saint-Jacques ridings.

In 2003, Laurier—Sainte-Marie was abolished when it was redistributed into Laurier and Hochelaga ridings.

After the 2004 election, Laurier riding was renamed "Laurier—Sainte-Marie" in 2004.

The name comes from Laurier Avenue, a street in Plateau Mont-Royal named after Wilfrid Laurier, and Sainte-Marie, a former name for Centre-Sud, which in turn came from a parish church dedicated to Saint Mary.

The riding was represented by Gilles Duceppe, leader of the Bloc Québécois, until 2011 when he was defeated by Hélène Laverdière of the New Democratic Party.

This riding lost territory to Outremont and Ville-Marie—Le Sud-Ouest—Île-des-Sœurs, and gained territory from Hochelaga, Westmount—Ville-Marie and Outremont during the 2012 electoral redistribution.

Former boundaries

Demographics
According to the Canada 2006 Census

Racial groups: 84.9% White, 3.6% Black, 2.9% Latin American, 2.1% Chinese, 1.8% Arab, 1.5% Southeast Asian, 1.4% South Asian 
Religions (2001): 68.5% Catholic, 2.8% Muslim, 2.8% Protestant, 1.4% Buddhist, 1.1% Christian Orthodox, 1.0% Other Christian, 21.0% No religion 
Average income: $25,079

According to the Canada 2016 Census
 Twenty most common mother tongue languages (2016) :  70.9% French, 10.4% English, 4.1% Spanish, 2.3% Arabic, 1.4% Mandarin, 1.2% Portuguese, 1.2% Cantonese, 0.9% Bengali, 0.7% Farsi, 0.7% Vietnamese, 0.6% Russian, 0.5% Italian, 0.4% German, 0.4% Romanian, 0.3% Creole languages, 0.3% Polish, 0.2% Greek, 0.2% Korean, 0.2% Japanese, 0.2% Turkish

Riding associations 
Riding associations are the local branches of political parties:

Members of Parliament

This riding has elected the following Members of Parliament:

Election results

See also
 List of Canadian federal electoral districts
 Past Canadian electoral districts

References

Notes

External links
Riding history from the Library of Parliament:
Laurier—Sainte-Marie (1987-2003), accessed 5 November 2006
Laurier (2003-2004), accessed 5 November 2006
Laurier—Sainte-Marie (2004-present), accessed 5 November 2006

Federal electoral districts of Montreal
Ville-Marie, Montreal
Centre-Sud
Le Plateau-Mont-Royal
Quartier Latin, Montreal